is an action role-playing fighting game developed by Dimps and published by Bandai Namco Entertainment based on the Dragon Ball franchise, and is the sequel to the 2015 game Dragon Ball Xenoverse. It was released on October 25, 2016, for PlayStation 4 and Xbox One, and on October 27 for Windows. In Japan, Dragon Ball Xenoverse 2 was initially only available on PlayStation 4. The game was released for the Nintendo Switch in Japan on September 7, 2017, and later released worldwide on September 22, 2017. The game was released on Stadia on December 17, 2019.

According to Bandai Namco, the game had sold over  copies worldwide .

Gameplay 
The game is very similar to its predecessor in terms of gameplay. It is primarily set in 3D battle arenas modeled after notable locations in the Dragon Ball universe, with the central hub being an expanded version of Toki-Toki City, known as Conton City. As reported by the creators of the game, Conton City is seven times larger than Toki-Toki City. Players are able to freely traverse the hub world, and in some areas are capable of flying, once they have unlocked the ability to fly. Players are also able to travel to other locations such as the Namekian Village and Frieza's ship. As in the previous games, some skills have to be learned through masters and other non-player characters, some of whom are found exclusively in those additional areas. Xenoverse 2 is the fourth Dragon Ball video game to feature character customization, and allows players to choose from five races: Humans, Saiyans, Majins, Namekians and Frieza's race, each with different strengths and weaknesses.

The game also features race-specific quests, minigames, and transformations (the latter of which was available only to Saiyans in the first game via the Super Saiyan forms). Players also have a much greater role in the story, as their choices can affect how the story unfolds. Multiplayer servers hold up to 3,000 players at once. The game also has a training mode called Training School. The player can use different kinds of ki blasts (Power, Homing, Rush, Paralyze and Bomb), and the ki blast type depends on the player's race or Super Soul. Additionally, players are able to transfer their save data from Dragon Ball Xenoverse. This results in a projection of the player's custom character from the previous game appearing as Toki Toki City's "Hero" in the middle of the square. Players may also select a premade avatar to serve as the "Hero" if they do not transfer save data.

Plot 
Two years after the events of Dragon Ball Xenoverse, the protagonist receives a mission from Elder Kai, which involves correcting history after it has changed. They meet the Supreme Kai of Time, a deity who watches over time, and her bird, TokiToki. After meeting Elder Kai, they are granted their first mission, which is to correct Goku's battle with Raditz after he's been enhanced by dark magic. Meanwhile, Towa and Mira, who've caused history to change, have gathered allies, from different parts of the timeline.

During the Attack of the Saiyans Saga, Turles attempts to intercept Goku to prevent him from assisting the Z Fighters against Nappa and Vegeta, only to be stopped by the combined forces of the Time Patroller and Goku. During the battle, Trunks and his partner, the protagonist from the first Xenoverse game, try to capture Turles, but he escapes before the Time Patroller can stop him. The protagonist then returns to the Time Nest after defeating Great Ape Nappa and Great Ape Vegeta, and correcting history. There, they are introduced to Trunks and his partner, and it is announced that TokiToki is laying an egg, which gives birth to another universe. During the Namek Saga, the Time Patroller helps Gohan and Krillin  from escaping from Dodoria and Zarbon. After the battle, the Time Patroller returns to the Time Nest only to find out that Captain Ginyu had switched bodies with Vegeta. The Time Patroller and Trunks attempt to fix this but in doing so, Ginyu switches bodies with Trunks. After the mishap, Ginyu finally switches bodies with Goku. After fighting the Ginyu possessed Goku, Ginyu returns to his body and attempts to switch bodies with the Time Patroller but Goku throws a Namekian frog in the beam, causing Ginyu to switch bodies with the frog. The Time Patroller must then help Nail fight Frieza in order for Gohan and Krillin to obtain the Dragon Balls, causing Trunks to intervene and help Gohan and the Time Patroller. During Goku's fight with Frieza, Cooler, Frieza's brother, arrives to help Frieza kill Goku, but is eventually defeated by the Time Patroller and Goku. In the Androids era, Trunks tries to help Gohan defeat the Androids once and for all, but is stopped by the Time Patroller. Trunks must take a break from time patrolling. The Time Patroller then travels to the Majin Buu era to fix the distortion in which Majin Vegeta sacrificed himself to defeat Majin Buu. Broly arrives, and attempts to kill Goku, Vegeta, and Buu, but is stopped by the Time Patroller. Vegeta sacrifices himself to destroy Majin Buu, restoring the current flow of history. The Time Patroller then goes to the timeline where Goku and Vegeta defeat Kid Buu. The Time Patroller chases after him and teleports to the era where Beerus and Goku are fighting. The Time Patroller defeats the Sayian, breaking his mask and revealing him to be Bardock. Mira arrives and engages in battle with the Time Patroller. Beerus interrupts the battle with the intention to destroy Mira, Goku, the Time Patroller, and Earth. Soon after, the Time Patroller travels to the Golden Frieza Saga, in which Frieza has been resurrected and wants revenge on Goku. During the battle, Cooler shows up again. Towa hacks into the Time Nest and tricks Beerus and Whis into leaving the battle, which allows Frieza to destroy the planet. Whis is able to rewind time and the Time Patroller, along with Goku and Vegeta, kill Cooler and Frieza. Shortly after the victory, the Duo of the Hero and Trunks are Ambushed by The Masked Saiyan and Towa, the former revealed to be Bardock, Goku's Father who was rescued by Towa from the destruction of Planet Vegeta and made to an ally for Towa. Freed from control, Bardock restrains Mira when Towa tries to trap Trunks and The Hero in a Black Hole in an attempt to trap the in a void, giving Towa no choice but to begin releasing the Hero from Xenoverse (Like Bardock, was made a slave by Towa). Fearing no alternative, Trunks and the Player's current hero win a skirmish, seemingly defeating Towa.

Shortly after returning to the Time Nest with the mask both Bardock and Hero had worn, Trunks and The Kais begin to ponder any changes. Realizing too late that the object they carried was a Trojan Horse, the group are ambushed by Towa and Mira again only to be brushed aside. During this, Towa made her objective clear; Earlier, the Tokitoki Bird who laid an egg, which when matured, births a new Multiverse. Seeing it as a source of power, Towa steals the recently conceived egg and plans to use it to rule the multiverse and Time. Before she can achieve her objected, Mira, now gaining a sense of Self, betrays his mentor and ends up absorbing both her and the egg, becoming a powerful foe capable of destroying all existence. At the last minute, Goku comes to the aid of the player and with the combine might of both warriors, Mira is destroyed, and the egg is recovered. The group then return to the nest just in time for the egg to hatch, birthing a new universe and the group along with Whis, Beerus, The previous Hero, and Goku stay and attend a party in celebration of both Towa and Mira's defeat and the hatching of the Egg.

Development 
The game was originally teased by Bandai Namco Entertainment on May 16, 2016, as a new "Dragon Ball project", with it being announced on May 17, 2016. A Bandai Namco spokesperson confirmed that the game would be released on the PlayStation 4 in Japan, and for PlayStation 4, Xbox One, and Windows in North America and Europe. Bandai Namco announced at E3 2016 that the game would run at a frame rate of 60 frames per second on all three platforms, would have a hub city that is seven times larger than its predecessor, and would also feature a new transportation system.

An open and closed beta for Xenoverse 2 was announced by Bandai Namco in August 2016. Both the open and closed beta were available exclusively on PlayStation 4. The closed beta began on October 8, and ended on October 10, and the open beta began on October 14, and ended on October 17.

The Collector's Edition of the game includes the game disc, a soundtrack CD, a collector's box, an exclusive steelbook case, a Time Patroller's Guide artbook (including an exclusive manga illustrated by Toyotarou based on the game), and a statue of Super Saiyan Goku. It is available for Xbox One and PlayStation 4.

A Nintendo Switch port was revealed on January 12, 2017, in the Nintendo Switch's "Software Line-Up" Video.

On March 20, 2019, a free-to-play "Lite Version" was released on PS4 and Xbox One with a subset of the full game's content and a lower level cap.

The Stadia port was revealed on December 17, 2019, on the "Stadia Community Blog" by the official Stadia team and released three hours later.

Downloadable content 
A series of downloadable content packs have been released, most of which include two to four characters, extra story mode missions, extra stages, new moves, skills, parallel quests, and other elements for the added characters.

 DLC Pack 1/Dragon Ball Super Pack 1 - Includes Frost and Cabba from Dragon Ball Super as playable characters.
 DLC Pack 2/Dragon Ball Super Pack 2 - Includes content from the Universe 6 Saga: Vados and God of Destruction Champa as playable characters, the Universe 6 Saga for story mode, and the Nameless Planet stage from DB Super
 DLC Pack 3/Dragon Ball Super Pack 3 - Includes Rosé Goku Black, Zamasu from Dragon Ball Super, and Bojack from the film Bojack Unbound as playable characters.
 DLC Pack 4/Dragon Ball Super Pack 4 - Includes content from Future Trunks Saga: Fused Zamasu and SSGSS Vegito as playable characters, the Warrior of Hope Saga for story mode, and the Future in Ruins stage from DB Super
 DLC Pack 5/Extra Pack 1 - Includes majin Buu (Gohan absorbed), Dabura from Dragon Ball Z's Buu Saga, and Android 13, Tapion from the films Super Android 13 and Wrath of the Dragon as playable characters.
 DLC Pack 6/Extra Pack 2 - Includes Goku (Ultra Instinct), Jiren, Android 17 (DB Super) from Dragon Ball Super, and an original character named Fu as playable characters, and a new extra mission "infinite history saga".
 DLC Pack 7/Extra Pack 3 - Includes Kefla (Super Saiyan) from Dragon Ball Super, and Super Baby 2 from Dragon Ball GT as playable characters.
 DLC Pack 8/Extra Pack 4 - Includes SSGSS Gogeta and Broly (Full Power  Super Saiyan) from the 2018 film Dragon Ball Super: Broly as playable characters, and the Tournament of Power arena from Dragon Ball Super.
 DLC Pack 9/Ultra Pack 1 - Includes Ribrianne and SSGSS Vegeta (Evolved) from Dragon Ball Super, and another variation of Vegeta (Super Saiyan God) from the 2018 film Dragon Ball Super: Broly as playable characters.
 DLC Pack 10/Ultra Pack 2 - Includes Uub as majuub from Dragon Ball GT and Android 21 from the 2018 video game Dragon Ball FighterZ as playable characters.
 August 2020 Free Update - Includes Supreme Kai of Time as a playable character in honor of the game selling 6 million copies worldwide.
 DLC Pack 11/Legendary Pack 1 - Includes Pikkon from the film Fusion Reborn and Toppo (God of Destruction) from Dragon Ball Super as playable characters, as well as two new expanded extra missions.
 DLC Pack 12/Legendary Pack 2 - Includes Kale (Super Saiyan 2), Caulifa (Super Saiyan 2), Jiren (Full Power) from Dragon Ball Super, and Gogeta (DB Super) from the 2018 film Dragon Ball Super: Broly as playable characters, and the Volcanic Wasteland stage from DBS Broly, as well as three new expanded extra missions.
 DLC Pack 13/Conton City Vote Pack- Includes Goku (Ultra Instinct - Sign-), Dyspo from Dragon Ball Super, and Vegeta (GT) from Dragon Ball GT as playable characters, as well as two new expanded extra missions.
 DLC Pack 14/Hero of Justice Pack 1 - Includes Gamma 1, Gamma 2 & Gohan (DBS Super Hero) from the 2022 film Dragon Ball Super: Super Hero as playable characters.
 DLC Pack 15/Hero of Justice Pack 2 - Will include Orange Piccolo from the 2022 film Dragon Ball Super: Super Hero as a playable character. The rest of the content is yet to be announced.
Masters Pack - Adds 5 Masters: Android 16 from the Android Saga, Bardock and Future Gohan from The Father of Goku and The History of Trunks television specials, Cooler from the film Cooler's Revenge, and Whis from Dragon Ball Super. Included with the base game on Stadia.
 Anime Music Pack 1 - Includes 11 songs from Dragon Ball, Dragon Ball Z, and Dragon Ball GT. Not available in the Stadia version.
 Anime Music Pack 2 - Includes songs from Dragon Ball Kai and Dragon Ball Super, and extra songs from Dragon Ball Z. Not available in the Stadia version.
 Pre-Order Bonus - Includes Goku Black from Dragon Ball Super as a playable character and the Tao Pai Pai Stick as a hub vehicle. It is also included in the Nintendo Switch version and Stadia version.
 Legend Patrol Pack - Includes the entire story campaign from the original Dragon Ball Xenoverse, in addition to its GT Saga DLC campaign. Initially from Nintendo Switch exclusive, it released to PS4, XBOX ONE, PC & Stadia alongside the launch of the Conton City Vote Pack.

Reception

 
Dragon Ball Xenoverse 2 has shipped over 1.4 million copies worldwide. As of November 27, 2016, the PS4 version has sold 87,105 copies in Japan. The Nintendo Switch version debuted at number three on the Japanese sales charts, with 24,045 copies sold and later sold 500,000 copies worldwide, by 2018.
Total sales reached over 5 million copies by the end of March 2019. Bandai Namco announced sales of  copies sold worldwide in May 2020, over 7 million copies sold worldwide by December 2020, and Over 8 million copies were sold by November 2021.

Dragon Ball Xenoverse 2 received positive reviews. Critics praised the game's anime visual style, sound, and fighting gameplay but criticized the controls, repetitive nature and overall similarity to the previous installment. Aggregating review website Metacritic gave the PlayStation 4 version 72/100 based on 57 reviews.

IGN awarded it a score of 7.5 out of 10, saying "Dragon Ball Xenoverse 2 is an ambitious, if rough-edged experience, with deceptively deep RPG and brawling elements." Hardcore Gamer awarded it 3 out of 5, calling it "a minimal improvement over its predecessor while sharing a lot of the same issues, but there's just something so endearing about how it all came together."

Heidi Kemps of GameSpot awarded the game a 7 out of 10, praising the combat and fan service, while criticizing the combat for being repetitive and the missions with a non-combat focus as "generally poor". Kyle Hilliard of Game Informer also awarded it a 7 out of 10, praising the addition of Conton City, but criticized the combat system for being almost identical to the first Xenoverse game and the soundtrack as "consistently awful".

Ashley Fonte from Games Mojo awarded it 4.3 out of 5 stars stating that "Dragon Ball Xenoverse 2 is an exciting anime game with a unique and ambitious concept that is familiar to the fans of the Dragon Ball Z series and will give them an enjoyable playing experience." Alastair Stevensons gave a score of 3.5/5 on Trusted Reviews, and said that "Combat is fun if you know how Dragon Ball works, but newbies will struggle to get their bearings, as Xenoverse 2s tuition system is, at best, hit-and-miss". "Smoother combat and great multiplayer options make Xenoverse 2 worth a play for fans of the series" was Benjamin Shillabeer-Hall's conclusion on PlayStation Universe, with a score of 7/10.

References

External links 
 
 Official Bandai Namco website, includes manual for PS4 and Xbox One

Fighting role-playing video games
2016 video games
PlayStation 4 games
Xbox One games
Windows games
Nintendo Switch games
Video games developed in Japan
Bandai Namco games
Namco games
Dimps games
Xenoverse 2
Fighting games
Video games featuring protagonists of selectable gender
Video games with cel-shaded animation
Multiplayer and single-player video games
Video games about time travel
Stadia games
Video games with downloadable content
Video games with customizable avatars